The Iranian ambassador in Ankara is the official representative of the Government in Tehran to the Government of Turkey.

The Persian embassy was established next to the Sublime Porte in 1852 (1230 years After the Hijrah AH) and Hajji Mirza Ahmad Khan Khoi was appointed to the expedition and the resident minister. The mission continued until 1854 (1232). 2 Mirza Abdul Rahim Khan Sa'id al-Mulk from 1854 (1232 AH) to 1857 (1235 AH) Shi'a 3. Farrokh Khan Aminolmolk Ghaffari

List of representatives

References 

 
Turkey
Iran